Club Patí Vic is a Spanish rink hockey club based in Vic, in the autonomous community of Catalonia. Founded in 1951, the club currently plays in the OK Liga, holding its home games at the Pavelló del Club Patí Vic, with capacity of 3,500 seats.

History

Founded in 1951, CP Vic is the oldest hockey club in the Catalan comarca of Osona. In the 1970s, the club acquired some terrains for its own development and its main arena was used for the 1992 Summer Olympics.

In 1999, CP Vic won its first national title by conquering the Copa del Rey, repeating this achievement in 2009, 2010 and most recently, in 2015.

In 2001, the club won its first European title by defeating Noia in the CERS Cup final. Vic also played three times the final of the CERH European League, but could not lift yet the trophy of the top European competition.

The club's last title was the Intercontinental Cup won in 2016 against Argentine club Huracán by 5–1. However, this title is not considered as official by the CERS.

Season to season

Trophies
OK Liga:
runners-up (3)
Copa del Rey: 4
1999, 2009, 2010, 2015
Supercopa de España: 2
2009, 2010
European Cup/Champions League:
runners-up (3)
CERS Cup: 1
2001

References

External links
 Official website

Catalan rink hockey clubs
Sports clubs established in 1951
1951 establishments in Spain
Vic